The West Semitic languages are a proposed major sub-grouping of ancient Semitic languages. The term was first coined in 1883 by Fritz Hommel.

The grouping, supported by Semiticists like Robert Hetzron and John Huehnergard, divides the Semitic language family into two branches: Eastern and Western. 

The West Semitic languages consist of the clearly defined sub-groups: Modern South Arabian, Old South Arabian, Ethiopic, Arabic, and Northwest Semitic (this including Hebrew, Aramaic, and the extinct Amorite and Ugaritic languages). 

The East Semitic languages, meanwhile, consist of the extinct Eblaite and Akkadian languages.

Ethiopic and South Arabian show particular common features, and are often grouped together as South Semitic. The proper classification of Arabic with respect to other Semitic languages is debated. In older classifications, it is grouped with the South Semitic languages. However, Hetzron and Huehnergard connect it more closely with the Northwest Semitic languages, to form Central Semitic. Some Semiticists continue to argue for the older classification, based on the distinctive feature of broken plurals. Some linguists also argue that Eteocypriot was a Northwest Semitic language spoken in ancient Cyprus.

References

Sources
Alice Faber, "Genetic Subgrouping of the Semitic Languages", in Hetzron, ed., 2013, The Semitic Languages, Routledge.

External links

 
1883 introductions
1880s neologisms
Semitic languages